Zabulistan ( Zābulistān/Zābolistān/Zāwulistān or simply  Zābul,  Zābəl), was a historical region in southern Afghanistan roughly corresponding to the modern provinces of Zabul and Ghazni. Following the Ghaznavid rule (977–1186), "Zabul" became largely synonymous with the name of its capital and main city, Ghazni.

By the tenth century, Islamic sources mention Zabulistan as part of the Khorasan marches, a frontier region between Khorasan and India. In the Tarikh-i Sistan, finished around 1062 CE, the author regards Zabul as part of the land of Sistan, stretching from the Hamun Oasis all the way to the Indus River.

Today, the modern Afghan province of Zabul and the Iranian city Zabol take their names from the historical region. Zabulistan has become popularized as the birthplace of the character Rostam of Ferdowsi's Shahnameh, in which the word "Zabulistan" is used interchangeably with "Sistan", which was another historical region, located in present-day eastern Iran (Sistan and Baluchestan Province) and southwestern Afghanistan (Nimruz, Helmand and Kandahar).

Names 
Zābulistān which is the Persian name of the region, literally means "the land of Zābul". The etymology of the name Zābul has been marred with speculation. The German historian Marquart, proposed the word, including its uncommon Medieval variant Jāwulistān as being a variation of the Sanskrit term. Others have speculated that the word zābul might be an abbreviation of zūnbīl, a supposed royal title of the region known from Arabic sources, earlier read as rutbīl, and now used to refer to a local dynasty of Zamindawar now called the Zunbils. This notion however currently stands on loose ground, and Minorsky holds that the consonant resemblance between these two words look merely fortuitous.

Jāguḍa, meaning saffron, was the Sanskrit name of the region.  It is also regarded as being referred to by this name in 644 CE by the Chinese traveling monk Xuanzang in the Chinese transliteration Tsau-kü-ta.

Geography 
The earliest detailed description of Zabulistan comes from the Great Tang Records on the Western Regions, written by the travelling monk Xuanzang in the early seventh century. He places the country of Tsau-kü-ta (Jāguḍa) between the Great Snowy Mountains (the Hindu Kush) and the Black Range (probably the Sulaiman mountains), bordering the country of Vrjisthāna in the north, Kāpiśī to its north-east and Kaikānān to its east. While the Chinese pilgrims never explored the south or west of the region, it is known from later Arabic accounts that Zabulistan at this time was bordered by Turan to its south and Rukhkhudh to its west."The country of Jāguda is more than seven thousand li in circuit, and its capital city, named Hexina (Ghazni), is over thirty li in circuit; but the capital is sometimes located in the city of Hesaluo (Guzar), which is also over thirty li in circuit, both cities being strongly fortified in invulnerable positions. The mountains and valleys are rich in natural resources, and the cultivated farmlands, divided by ridges, are high and dry. Crops are sown in proper seasons. Winter wheat is abundant, and vegetation is luxuriant with profuse flowers and fruits. The soil is good for growing aromatic turmeric, and it produces the hingu herb (Ferula asafoetida), which grows in the Rama-Indu Valley. In the city of Hesaluo there are gushing springs, the water of which flows to all sides, and the people make use of it for irrigation. The climate is severely cold with much frost and snow."
- Xuanzang, 644 CEDuring the Medieval Islamic era, the region is continuously mentioned in geographical works such as Istakhri's Kitab al-Masalik (930-933 CE), the Hudud al 'Alam (982 CE), Qazvīnī's Nuzhat al-Qulub etc. As a dry region among the Khorasan marches, famous for its fruits, good hunting grounds and fine pastures. The region is likewise described by Zahir ud-Din Babur in the early sixteenth century in his memoirs the Baburnama, which he roughly equates with the Timurid province of Ghazni. At this time, the region of Ghazni is described as bordering Kabul in its northeast, Zurmat to its east and Kandahar to its southwest."Ghazni, in the third clime, is also known as Zabul. Zabulistan consists of this province, and some consider Kandahar to be in Zabulistan. Ghazni is fourteen leagues southwest of Kabul. Those who take the road leave Ghazni at daybreak and arrive in Kabul in the afternoon, whereas the thirteen league road between Kabul and Adinapur (near modern Jalalabad) is so poor that no one can do it in a day. It is a miserable province. The river is a four- or five mill stream. The city of Ghazni and another four or five villages are watered by it, while another three or four others are irrigated by subterranean aqueducts. The grapes and melons of Ghazni are better than those of Kabul; the apples are also good and are taken to Hindustan (India). The agriculture is laborous because new soil must be brought in every year for whatever amount of land is planted. The yield, however, is better than that of Kabul. They plant madder, the best crop, all which is taken to Hindustan."

Zahir ud-Din Babur, 1504-6 CE

History

Pre-Islamic period
The first mentions of the region coincides with its takeover by the Iranian Huns in the 4th century. Initially being conquered by the Alkhan, then the Nezaks in the 5th century. The region fell to the Turk Shahis in the 7th century, then being controlled by a collection loose suzerains of the Hindu Shahis to the 10th century. According to Andre Wink:

The region was finally conquered and Islamized by the Ghaznavids after 961 CE.

The Alkhans 
The first mentions of the word Zabul is from coinage of what's known as "the early anonymous clan-rulers". These were late fourth-century tribal chiefs and possibly former governors of the Sasanids from the north of the Hindu Kush, who following the course of the Kidarites, declared independence from Sasanid dominance. By 384/5 CE, they controlled Kāpiśī and Gandhara, and started minting their own characteristic coins in the formerly Sasanian mint. A set of these anonymous coins including some of the coins of king Khingila I, the first of Alkhan kings known by name, bore the legend Shāh Zāwbul Ālkhān (Bactrian: ϸαυο ζαοβλ αλχανο) translated as 'King of Zabul Alkhan'. This suggests Alkhan control of the Zabulistan region southwest of modern Kabul from an early time of Alkhan dominance in the region. Alkhan power, primarily based in the Kapisa and Gandhara valleys, was seldom concentrated with one king alone, as shown by the variety of Alkhan coins minted simultaneously in the different regions of the empire's control, which by 484 CE reached all the way to Mawla in Central India. Northern Zabulistan is understood to have remained under nominal control of the Alkhan rulers of Kāpiśī, with the rest remaining under nominal Sasanid rule until Peroz I's defeat by the Hephthalites in 484 CE, which facilitated the takeover of Zabulistan by the new independent ruler Nezak Shah.

The Nezaks 
Following the collapse of Sasanid control in Tokharistan in 484 CE, and with Alkhan coinage expanding into the Indian subcontinent, numismatic evidence accounts for the consolidation of a new dynasty in Kapisa and Zabul. The Nezak Shah dynasty, identified through their unique coin designs and the Pahlavi Nezak Shah stamp (previously interpreted by Göbl as Napki MLK) on their coins, supposedly opened a mint in Ghazni (which's coins are identified by Göbl as the š-group of Nezak coinage) following 484 CE. Later, they managed to also consolidate their rule over Kāpiśī, where they overtook the local mint around the first quarter of the 6th-century CE (whose coins are identified by Göbl as the ā-group). Unlike the contemporary Hephthalites and Alkhan, they did not use a tamga, but instead donned a golden winged bull-headed crown as their primary signifier.

Sometime after 532 CE, after Mihrakulas devastating defeat against Yasodharman at Mawla, Alkhan power is understood to have subsequently returned to the Gandhara and the Kāpiśī valleys, thereby having to confront the Nezaks. Whether this encounter was mostly peaceful or hostile is currently unknown, but has been recorded in part among numismatic evidence, from Alkhan coins minted in Gandhara with the characteristic Nezak bull-headed crown over an otherwise typically Alkhan design, to the overstriking of Nezak coins in the second half of the 6th century by the Alkhan ruler Toramana II. At around the same period, the Sasanians under Khusro I (r. 531-579) briefly reestablished their control of Balkh, and probably also Zabulistan, which is supported by a Sasanian administrative seal found there from the same period. Succeeding Sasanian control of Zabulistan by the end of the 6th-century, a new group of coins are struck with an š-mint (Zabul) brand and in a design reminiscent of both Alkhan and Nezak coinage, though ultimately missing the bull-headed crown of the Nezaks and struck with the Alkhan tamga, while the Nezak ā-coinage is retained in Kāpiśī. This new issue is known as the Alkhan-Nezak Crossover, and which dynasty continued to issue coinage from the Ghazni-mint until the middle of the 7th century.

The Kabul Shahis 

The Kabul Shahis are generally split up into two eras: the Buddhist Shahis and the Hindu Shahis, with the change-over thought to have occurred sometime around 870 CE. The kingdom was known as the Kabul Shahan or Ratbelshahan from 565 CE to 670 CE, when the capitals were located in Kapisa and Kabul, and later Udabhandapura, also known as Hund, for its new capital. The kingdoms of Kapisa-Gandhara in modern-day Afghanistan, Zabulistan and Sindh (which then held Makran) in modern-day Pakistan, all of which were culturally and politically part of ancient India since ancient times, were known as "The Frontier of Al Hind".

The Hindu Shahis under Jayapala, is known for his struggles in defending his kingdom against the Ghaznavids for the control over Zabulistan and the surrounding region. Jayapala saw a danger in the consolidation of the Ghaznavids and invaded their capital city of Ghazni both in the reign of Sebuktigin and in that of his son Mahmud, which initiated the Muslim Ghaznavid and Hindu Shahi struggles. Sebuk Tigin, however, defeated him, and he was forced to pay an indemnity. Jayapala defaulted on the payment and took to the battlefield once more. Jayapala, however, lost control of the entire region from Zabulistan to between the Kabul Valley and Indus River.

However, Jayapala's army was hopeless in battle against the Ghaznavid forces, particularly against the young Mahmud of Ghazni. In the year 1001, soon after Sultan Mahmud came to power and was occupied with the Qarakhanids north of the Hindu Kush, Jayapala attacked Ghazni once more and upon suffering yet another defeat by the powerful Ghaznavid forces, near present-day Peshawar. After the Battle of Peshawar, he committed suicide because his subjects thought he had brought disaster and disgrace to the Shahis. Jayapala was succeeded by his son Anandapala, who along with other succeeding generations of the Shahis took part in various unsuccessful campaigns against the advancing Ghaznavids but were unsuccessful. These Ghaznavid victories in these wars resulted in the Islamization of Zabulistan and the surrounding regions.

The Rutbils

According to book writer André Wink,

According to C. E. Bosword:

Saffarid invasion 

The region of southern Afghanistan was first invaded by Muslim Arabs from Zaranj in what is now Nimruz Province. From there they marched toward Bost, Kandahar, Zabulistan, and reached Kabul. In 683 Kabul revolted and defeated the Muslim army, but two years later Zabul's army was routed by the Arabs.

The Ghaznavids 
The Ghaznavid ascendancy in Zabulistan began with Sebuktigin and in that of his son Mahmud. After the Ghaznavid defeat of the Hindu Shahis, the region was finally conquered and Islamized by the Ghaznavids after 961 CE.

Religion

Hindu and Buddhist period
During Hindu and Buddhist period Zabulistan is known to have been a place of various religious cults and practices, with Ghazni being an old stop on the silk and spice trade flowing between Tokharistan and India. Chinese monk Xuanzang recorded numerous Buddhist stupas and monasteries supposedly built by Ashoka and several dozen Hindu temples, which were demolished by Islamic invaders around 653/54 CE. Xuanzang also made an account of Zabul (which he called by its Sanskrit name Jaguda), which he describes as mainly Hindus, though also respecting Mahayana Buddhism, which although in the minority had the support of its royals. In terms of other cults, the god Śuna, is described to be the prime deity of the country. Although they worship various gods, they respect the Triple Gem. There are several hundred monasteries with more than ten thousand monks, all of whom study Mahayana teachings. The reigning king is a man of pure faith who inherited a throne handed down through many generations. He has engaged himself in performing meritorious deeds and is intelligent and studious. There are more than ten stupas built by king Asoka. Deva-temples number several tens, and the heretics, who are in the majority, live together. Their disciples are extremely numerous, and they worship the god Śuna.- Xuanzang, The Great Tang Records on the Western Regions, 644 CE

Zhun 
He goes on to describe the god as residing on top of a mountain in Zabul called the Śunāsīra mountain, where people came "from far and near and high and low", even attracting kings, ministers, officials and common people of regions where different customs were observed, to pay homage and make donations. They either offer gold, silver, and rare gems or present sheep, horses, and other domestic animals to the god in competition with each other to show their piety and sincerity. Therefore, gold and silver are scattered all over the ground, and sheep and horses fill up the valley. Nobody dares to covet them, for everyone is eager to make offerings to the god. To those who respect and serve the heretics and practice asceticism whole-heartedly, the god imparts magical incantations, of which the heretics make effective use in most cases; for the treatment of disease, they are quite efficacious.- Xuanzang, 644 CEThe god Śuna is again mentioned in Islamic sources in the recounting of the Saffarid conquest of Zabulistan, in the Arabic rendering Zūn (Arabic: زون). These sources mention two temples, one at Zamindawar and one at Sakkawand. The temple at Sakkawand was sacked and plundered in 870 CE.

Sakawand a pilgrimage centre
Sakawand was a major centre of Hindu pilgrimage.

See also
 Zabul Province
 Zabol
 Zunbils
 Abu Ali Lawik
 Sajawand
 Zamindawar

Notes

Citations

Bibliography

External links 
 The Countenance of the Other: The Coins of the Huns and Western Turks in Central Asia and India

Buddhism in Afghanistan
Hinduism in Afghanistan
Historical regions of Afghanistan
Kabul Shahi
Persian mythology
Places in Shahnameh